"Royal Variety Show" is a mini-episode of the BBC sit-com, Only Fools and Horses. It was performed live at the Royal Variety Performance on 24 November 1986, and first screened on BBC 1 on 29 November 1986.

Synopsis
Del Boy, Rodney and Uncle Albert arrive at The Theatre Royal, Drury Lane, London thinking they are delivering Whisky to Chunky Lewis, a nightclub owner in the West End. Unfortunately they take a wrong turn and end up walking into the middle of the Royal Variety Performance.

Episode cast

1988 British television episodes
Only Fools and Horses special episodes